Steuben County Courthouse is a historic courthouse located at Angola, Steuben County, Indiana. It was built in 1867–1868, and is a two-story, rectangular, brick building with Greek Revival, Italianate, and Romanesque Revival style design influences.  It features a gable roof with bracketed eaves and topped by an octagonal domed cupola with a square base and captain's walk.

It was listed on the National Register of Historic Places in 1975.

References

County courthouses in Indiana
Courthouses on the National Register of Historic Places in Indiana
Greek Revival architecture in Indiana
Italianate architecture in Indiana
Romanesque Revival architecture in Indiana
Government buildings completed in 1868
Buildings and structures in Steuben County, Indiana
National Register of Historic Places in Steuben County, Indiana